Terri Scott is the former Principal of Northern Regional College, Northern Ireland, a position she held from 2014 to 2021.

Prior to this post, she was the first female President of Institute of Technology, Sligo (ITS), from 2008 to 2014. She was the fourth woman in history to serve as President of one of the institutes of technology in Ireland. Her academic career consists of more than two decades of work on multiple continents.

Scott is originally from Derry, Northern Ireland, where she still resides with her husband Chris. They have three children Peter (born 1986), Bronagh (born 1989) and Claire (born 1990). She was schooled at Thornhill College before progressing to the University of Ulster and Queen's University Belfast. She spent time studying economics and geography. As a postgraduate she studied informatics.

At the University of Ulster she progressed to become dean and head of the university's School of Computing and Mathematics. She has been a visiting faculty member at Carnegie Mellon University (CMU) and the Massachusetts Institute of Technology (MIT) and been involved with other universities around Europe and in Asia.

In 2000, the British Computer Society awarded her with "IT Professional of the Year", the first time a woman had achieved this accolade.

Scott established the Northern Ireland Centre for Entrepreneurship, also directing it. She was Managing Director of Invest Northern Ireland from 2002 to 2006. She then moved on to become the founding CEO of the Ryan Academy of Entrepreneurship. Currently, she is a director and boardmember of IDA Ireland.

In November 2008 she became President of Institute of Technology, Sligo.

At the ninth annual Careers' Fair on 21 January 2009, she said:

References

Alumni of Queen's University Belfast
Alumni of Ulster University
Irish women academics
Living people
People from Derry (city)
People educated at Thornhill College
Year of birth missing (living people)
Academics of Ulster University